Glenea johani is a species of beetle in the family Cerambycidae. It was described by Karl-Ernst Hüdepohl in 1996.

References

johani
Beetles described in 1996